A tritare is an experimental guitar invented in 2003 by mathematicians Samuel Gaudet and Claude Gauthier of the Université de Moncton of a family of stringed instruments which use Y-shaped strings, instead of the usual linear strings.

Instrument sound and reactions
Y-shaped strings can produce sounds which are harmonic integer multiples, but also non-harmonic sounds more akin to those produced by percussion instruments.

The model uses 6 strings and was commercially available for a short period. The sound effects achieved with the instrument are similar to the sounds that can be achieved with the 3rd bridge playing technique. When tuned correctly, the Y-shaped strings create Chladni patterns.

Depending on how each note is played, Gaudet explains that non-harmonic ingredients can be included and offer a richer sound than a classical stringed instrument. However the value of this greater possibility has been questioned by physicist and acoustics specialist Bernard Richardson of Cardiff University, who considers the branched string as just a simple analogue of complex structures with curved shells such as bars, cymbals, bells, and gongs. Richardson also claims that the tritare sounds bad.

Footnotes

References

Experimental string instruments
Guitars
2003 in music
2003 musical instruments
Canadian musical instruments
New Brunswick music